The 2022 VMI Keydets football team represented the Virginia Military Institute  as a member of the Southern Conference (SoCon) during the 2022 NCAA Division I FCS football season. The Keydets were led by eighth-year head coach Scott Wachenheim and played their home games at Alumni Memorial Field in Lexington, Virginia.

Previous season

The Keydets finished the 2021 season with a record of 6–5, 4–4 SoCon play to finish a 3 way tie for fourth place.

Schedule

Game summaries

at No. 22 (FBS) Wake Forest

Bucknell

Cornell

at Western Carolina

East Tennessee State

at No. 10 Chattanooga

Furman

No. 16 Mercer

at No. 10 Samford

at Wofford

The Citadel

References

VMI
VMI Keydets football seasons
VMI Keydets football